The Renault R25 was the Formula One car entered by Renault in the 2005 season. The chassis was designed by Bob Bell, James Allison, Tim Densham and Dino Toso with Pat Symonds overseeing the design and production of the car as executive director of Engineering and Bernard Dudot leading the engine design. The car won both the Drivers' and Constructors' Championships in 2005, the first titles for any car racing with a French licence since the Matra MS80's triumph in the 1969 season.

History 
During the season, the car turned out to be slower than the McLaren MP4-20 at numerous points, with the win tally being 8–10. Reliability and consistency prevailed in the end, with Fernando Alonso and Giancarlo Fisichella taking the car to the last win and titles for a V10 powered Formula One car, marking the end of an era.

This car also claimed Michelin's first of only two titles since its return in Formula One, winning the title again with Renault (the R26 2006-spec car) in the 2006 season, the last for the French tyre maker. The R25 was the first Constructors' Championship winning car since 1991 not to have been designed by either Adrian Newey or Rory Byrne.

Over 19 races, it scored 191 points, 8 wins, 15 podiums and was fully out of the points just twice in 18 starts (not counting the United States Grand Prix where both Renault drivers, in common with all their fellow Michelin tyre runners, withdrew prior to starting).

The R25 was also the last Renault Formula One car to use a 6-speed gearbox before the switch to a mandatory 7-speed gearbox in the following season.

Sponsorship and livery 
Renault used 'Mild Seven' logos, except at the Canadian, United States, French, British, Turkish, Italian and Belgian Grands Prix.

Later uses 
In Episode 8 of Series 10 of the BBC show Top Gear, in 2007, presenter Richard Hammond drove the R25 around the Stowe Circuit at Silverstone, completing two laps.

On 11 December 2020 Alonso drove the car for the first time in 15 years, hours before the start of the first practice session shown on Sky Sports, and after the qualifying session for the 2020 Abu Dhabi Grand Prix. The car used Pirelli demo slick tyres, rather than the original Michelin grooved tyres.

Complete Formula One results 
(key)  (results in bold indicate pole position; races in italics indicate fastest laps)

References 

R25
2005 Formula One season cars
Formula One championship-winning cars